Lakshmi Movie Makers is an Indian film production and distribution company headed by K. Muralidharan, V. Swaminathan and G. Venugopal.

History 
Lakshmi Movie Makers experienced significant success in the mid-1990s, with several projects such as Gokulathil Seethai (1996) and Unnidathil Ennai Koduthen (1998) becoming profitable. V. Swaminathan, one of the producers occasionally made cameo appearances in his productions.

Producer V. Swaminathan's son Ashwin Raja made his debut as an actor in Boss Engira Bhaskaran (2010) and has since appeared in comedy roles.

By the end of the 2010s, the studio remained largely inactive owing to the rising costs of operating in the Tamil film industry.

Filmography

References

External links 
 Official website

Film distributors of India
Film production companies based in Chennai
1994 establishments in Tamil Nadu
Indian companies established in 1994
Mass media companies established in 1994